Baroda High School is a group of schools run by the Baroda Lions Club Education Trust in Vadodara, Gujarat, India.

History
In June 1961 the Baroda Lions Club Education Trust was established. Baroda High School, Bagikhana was started by them in the same year in premises provided by The Maharaja of Baroda, Ltd. Col. Sir Fatehsingh Rao Gaekwad at a token rent of Rs. 1/-.

Baroda High School, Bagikhana started as one of the first co-ed English medium schools of Gujarat. Baroda High School boasts of stalwart alumnus such as Mr. Vikram Pandit, CEO Citibank N.A.

In 1964 Baroda School, ONGC was opened on the ONGC premises to meet the needs of this organisation, at their request.

In 1974, the government of Gujarat allotted a plot of land in Alkapuri and Baroda High School, Alkapuri was started.

In 1996, Baroda High School, Danteshwar was started. All the schools are English medium and co-educational schools, and have Pre-Primary, Primary, Secondary and Higher Secondary sections.

Curriculum
All the schools follow the syllabus laid down by the Gujarat State Education Board (GSEB), Department of Education, Gujarat Government. It prepares the pupils to appear for SSC and HSC Science and General Stream Examinations conducted by GSEB. All the schools are English medium and co-educational.

Board of trustees

See also
Baroda High School, Alkapuri
Baroda High School, Bagikhana
Bright School, Vadodara

References

Schools in Vadodara